Boxted House is a Grade II listed house in Boxted, Essex.

It was built in about 1830.

It was home to the advertising executive Bobby Bevan (1901-1974), the son of the painters Robert Polhill Bevan and Stanislawa de Karlowska, and his wife, Natalie Bevan (née Ackenhausen, 1909–2007), the artist and collector.

References

Borough of Colchester
Grade II listed houses
Grade II listed buildings in Essex
Houses in Essex